Hyposmocoma empedota is a species of moth of the family Cosmopterigidae. It was first described by Edward Meyrick in 1915. It is endemic to the Hawaiian island of Oahu. The type locality is the Koʻolau Range behind Honolulu.

The larvae probably feed on lichen on the bark of Acacia koa, Manihot glaziovii, Prosopis and other trees. The larva is a case-maker. The case does not have the wide flange that the case of Hyposmocoma alliterata has.

The development of the pseuduncuslike organs on the male abdomen is extraordinary. There is a large one on the right side of the seventh segment, a similar long one from the left side of the sixth segment, and much smaller ones on the left side of the seventh segment and the right side of the sixth segment.

External links

empedota
Endemic moths of Hawaii
Moths described in 1915